Nicholas V. V. Franchot may refer to:

 Nicholas Van Vranken Franchot (1855–1943), New York State Superintendent of Public Works
 Nicholas V. V. Franchot II (1884–1938), New York assemblyman